The 15th New Brunswick Legislative Assembly represented New Brunswick between February 6, 1851, and May 19, 1854.

The assembly sat at the pleasure of the Governor of New Brunswick Edmund Walker Head.

Charles Simonds was chosen as speaker for the house. After Simonds resigned his seat, William Crane served as speaker from January 1852 to March 1853 when he resigned due to poor health. Daniel Hanington was chosen to replace Crane as speaker.

List of members

Notes:

References
Journal of the House of Assembly of ... New Brunswick from ... February to ... April, 1851 ... (1851)

Terms of the New Brunswick Legislature
1851 in Canada
1852 in Canada
1853 in Canada
1854 in Canada
1851 establishments in New Brunswick
1854 disestablishments in New Brunswick